TER Auvergne was the regional rail network serving Auvergne région, France. In 2017 it was merged into the new TER Auvergne-Rhône-Alpes.

Network

Rail

Bus 
 Arlanc – Ambert – Thiers – Vichy
 Neussargues – Riom-ès-Montagnes – Bort-les-Orgues
 Clermont-Ferrand – Bort-les-Orgues – Mauriac – Saint-Martin-Valmeroux
 Aurillac – Mauriac – Bort-les-Orgues
 Le Puy-en-Velay – La Chaise-Dieu – Ambert
 Dunières – Firminy
 Le Puy-en-Velay – Langogne – Mende
 Bort-les-Orgues – Ussel
 Montluçon – Ussel
 Montluçon – Saint-Éloy-les-Mines – Clermont-Ferrand

Rolling stock

Multiple units

 SNCF Class X 2100
 SNCF Class X 2800
 SNCF Class X 4300
 SNCF Class X 4500
 SNCF Class X 4630
 SNCF Class X 4750
 SNCF Class X 72500
 SNCF Class X 73500
 SNCF Class X 76500 (XGC X 76500)
On order:
 SNCF Class Z 27500 (ZGC Z 27500)

Locomotives

 SNCF Class BB 67400

See also
SNCF
Transport express régional
Réseau Ferré de France
List of SNCF stations
List of SNCF stations in Auvergne
Auvergne (region)

External links 
TER Auvergne website